Peter Deakin (18 October 1953 – 1 February 2003) was a rugby league and rugby union administrator. He also had a short career as a professional rugby league player.

Biography

After a spell learning the industry of sports marketing in America, he returned to England and joined Bradford Bulls as a marketing executive in 1995. Along with coach Brian Smith, Deakin helped revolutionise the club's image ahead of the inaugural Super League season. As a result, crowds at Odsal Stadium rose sharply; the club's average crowd was over 10,000 in 1996, and by the end of the club's second season in Super League in 1997, the average attendance was over 15,000.

Following this success, Saracens owner Nigel Wray lured him to Watford, where he delivered five-figure crowds for Premiership club Saracens, including the then record 19,000 crowd at Saracens Watford home.

His love of Rugby League proved too great, however, and he leapt at the chance to take over at Warrington Wolves. However, he felt there were those at Wilderspool who did not share his vision, and after securing the Community Stadium (now renamed Halliwell Jones Stadium), he left.

After a short tenure he bought into the vision of Sale Sharks' owner Brian Kennedy and started the processes which eventually led to Sale Sharks crowds of over 10,000, and the Guinness Premiership victory in 2006. Peter was hit by the cancer, and although he battled bravely and had another spell at Saracens, it finally ended his life prematurely in 2003.

Peter was remembered by the naming of the Man of the Match Trophy in the Guinness Premiership Final.

References

External links 
 http://www.playtheball.com/columns/richards/richards19.asp

1953 births
2003 deaths
Deaths from cancer in the United Kingdom
Oldham R.L.F.C. players
People from Oldham
Place of birth missing